Robert Allan may refer to:

Poetry
 Robert Allan (poet) (1774–1841), Scottish poet
 Rob Allan (born 1945), New Zealand poet

Politics
 Robert Allan, Baron Allan of Kilmahew (1914–1979), Conservative politician
 Robert George Allan (1879–1972), agricultural administrator in India
 Robert M. Allan (1880–?), member of the City Council in Los Angeles, 1921–1927
 Robert Allan (trade unionist), leader of the Scottish Trades Union Congress

Other
 Robert Allan (businessman) (1847–1927), manufacturer in Christchurch, New Zealand
 Robert Allan (footballer), goalkeeper for Sunderland A.F.C. (1907–08)
 Robert Allan (mineralogist) (1806–1863), Fellow of the Royal Society of Edinburgh, Fellow of the Geological Society
 Robert Allan Ltd., Canadian naval architectural firm

See also
Robert Allen (disambiguation)